Veronica epacridea, synonym Hebe epacridea, is a plant of the family Plantaginaceae. It is endemic to altitudes above 3,000 feet from the Marlborough Region to Otago region on the South Island of New Zealand. It is a low-growing, evergreen shrub, reaching 10 cm in height, with thick, closely placed, recurved green leaves that are 5–7 mm long. Flowers are white.

References

 GBIF entry
 Hebe Society entry
 Tuatara, vol. 12, issue 1, March 1964.
 Steven J. Wagstaff, Michael J. Bayly, Philip J. Garnock-Jones and Dirk C. Albach, "Classification, Origin, and Diversification of the New Zealand Hebes (Scrophulariaceae)", Annals of the Missouri Botanical Garden, Vol. 89, No. 1 (Winter, 2002), pp. 38–63.

epacridea
Flora of New Zealand